José Díaz-Balart Caballero (born November 7, 1960) is a Cuban-American journalist and television anchorman. On September 7, 2021, Diaz-Balart stepped down as anchor of the weeknight editions of Noticias Telemundo. He is currently anchoring a new 11 A.M. show called José Díaz-Balart Reports, on MSNBC. He also continues to anchor NBC Nightly News Saturday, frequently substitutes for the weekday and Sunday broadcast, and will continue to anchor breaking news and special events coverage for Telemundo and host monthly specials.

Early life
Diaz-Balart's family left Cuba in 1959, and he was raised in Madrid, Spain. He is the son of Rafael Díaz-Balart y Gutiérrez (a former Cuban politician) and Hilda Caballero Brunet. He has three brothers: Rafael Díaz-Balart (a banker), Mario Díaz-Balart (a U.S. representative) and attorney Lincoln Díaz-Balart (a former U.S. representative). His uncle, Waldo Diaz-Balart is an internationally recognized painter. His aunt, Mirta Diaz-Balart, was Fidel Castro's first wife and therefore Fidel Castro is his uncle through marriage, and the late Fidel Castro Jr. (Fidelito) was his first cousin.

Career
After spending a brief time in radio, he worked in print journalism during the mid-1980s, for United Press International. In December, 1984 he became the Central American Bureau Chief for what was then called the Spanish International Network (today known as Univision). In 1987 he was one of the group of Journalists that founded Telemundo news, creating Noticias Telemundo/HBC. He subsequently established himself as a television news reporter in Miami, where he worked for WTVJ from 1988 till he was hired by CBS in May 1996. In August 1996, he made history by becoming the first Cuban-American to host a network news program when he began anchoring for the CBS News program This Morning. By 2000, he returned to Spanish language network television; he became the anchor of a new Telemundo morning program called Esta Manana. He later co-hosted Telemundo's first morning news and entertainment show, Esta Mañana, as well as its public affairs show, Cada Día. By 2002, the bilingual anchor began hosting a once-a-month interview program on Telemundo, Enfoque con José Diaz-Balart; on that program, he has interviewed a wide range of news-makers, including political leaders and candidates for president. He has interviewed every U.S. president since Ronald Reagan. In 2003, he returned to English-language TV, and to his former station in Miami, WTVJ, as a news anchor. In 2009 he became the anchor of Telemundo's evening newscast, Noticias Telemundo.

By 2010, he was doing some reporting for NBC. He again made history when he substituted for Contessa Brewer on MSNBC Live for the week of June 20 through 24, 2011, in the show's 12 PM time slot, making him the first U.S. journalist to broadcast both English and Spanish newscasts on two networks simultaneously.

From 2014 to 2016 Diaz-Balart hosted the 10 AM news hour for MSNBC, replacing Chris Jansing. It was announced on November 10, 2014, that he would be taking over hosting duties on The Daily Rundown on November 17, 2014, with the program expanding to two hours, essentially absorbing his eponymous show that had previously aired during the second hour.  The Daily Rundown later became known as MSNBC Live with Jose Diaz-Balart as part of a wider restructuring of MSNBC's dayside programming in 2015. In late 2015, he also began working as a fill-in anchor for the Saturday edition of NBC Nightly News. He was officially named host of that program in July 2016, and he continues in that position today.

On February 18, 2016, Diaz-Balart moderated the Democratic Town Hall with Hillary Clinton and Bernie Sanders, in Las Vegas Nevada. 
On June 26 and 27 of 2019, Diaz-Balart co-moderated the first Democratic Presidential Debates on NBC and Telemundo.

On September 7, 2021, it was announced he was stepping down as anchor of the weeknight editions of Noticias Telemundo to anchor a new 10 A.M. show called José Díaz-Balart Reports on MSNBC. He will continue to anchor NBC Nightly News Saturday, and will continue to anchor breaking news and special events coverage for Telemundo and host monthly specials.

Awards
Diaz-Balart is the recipient of five national Emmys for his work with Telemundo Network, including 2020-2021 Outstanding Newscast Anchor.  He previously received two SunCoast Emmy awards while working at WTVJ-TV in Miami; an Associated Press Award and four Hispanic Excellence in Journalism Awards, all in the 1980s. He also received a Du Pont and Peabody. Media 100 has named him best news anchor three times, and Hispanic Business Magazine named him one of the "100 most influential people in the U.S."  He was recognized with the Silver Circle Award by the National Academy of Television Sciences in 2010.  In 2012, Multichannel News and Broadcasting & Cable presented him with the Award for Outstanding Achievement in Hispanic Television at the 10th Annual Hispanic Television Summit, produced by Schramm Marketing Group. He was named GQ Magazine's Best International Journalist in 2017.  In 2022 Diaz-Balart received the TV Broadcast Journalist Award by the MulitCultural Media Correspondents Association in Washington DC.

Personal life
His wife's name is Brenda.  They have two daughters together. His daughters are named Katrina and Sabrina.

References

Bibliography
 The Cuban Americanos, New Americans, by Miguel González-Pando; Greenwood Publishing Group, 1998; 
 Cuba: intrahistoria: una lucha sin tregua, by Rafael L. Díaz-Balart; Ediciones Universal, 2006;

External links
 

1960 births
American television journalists
American people of Cuban descent
Hispanic and Latino American journalists
Living people
Josea
American male journalists
MSNBC people
CBS News people
People from Fort Lauderdale, Florida